Brygada Częstochowa was a football team from Częstochowa, Poland. The team was supported by Częstochowa's garrison of the Polish Army and in the 1930s it played in regional soccer A-Class tournament of the Kielce region. Brygada unsuccessfully tried to get promoted to the Polish Soccer League. Its most famous player was goalkeeper Adolf Krzyk.

Sport in Częstochowa
Football clubs in Silesian Voivodeship
Defunct football clubs in Poland